White Cloud Township  is the name of two townships in the United States:

 White Cloud Township, Mills County, Iowa
 White Cloud Township, Nodaway County, Missouri

See also
 White Cloud (disambiguation)

Township name disambiguation pages